Samuel Spencer (March 2, 1847 – November 29, 1906) was an American civil engineer, businessman, and railroad executive. With an education interrupted by service in the Confederate cavalry late in the American Civil War, he completed his education at the University of Georgia and the University of Virginia.
  
Spencer spent his career with railroads, rising through the ranks during the busy growth years of American railroading in the late 19th century. He eventually became president of six railroads, and was a director of at least ten railroads and several banks and other companies.

Although his career was cut short when he was killed in a train wreck in Virginia in 1906, Samuel Spencer is best remembered as the Father of the Southern Railway System. Spencer, North Carolina, site of the North Carolina Transportation Museum, was named in his honor.

Railroads
In 1869, he began working with railroads as a surveyor, and rose through the ranks, learning many aspects of railroad management. He became superintendent of the Long Island Rail Road in 1878 and was president of the Baltimore and Ohio Railroad (B&O) during 1887–1888.

In 1889, Spencer left the presidency of the B&O to become a railroad expert working for financier J.P. Morgan of Drexel, Morgan and Company. According to the New York Times, "It was said of him that there was no man in the country so thoroughly well posted on every detail of a railroad from the cost of a car brake to the estimate for a new terminal."

When the bankrupt Richmond and Danville Railroad (R&D) was acquired by Drexel, Morgan and Company in 1894, the new Southern Railway was formed by the financiers from a consolidation of the R&D and the East Tennessee, Virginia and Georgia Railroad.

Tapped to lead the new railroad for Morgan, Spencer became its first president. Under his leadership, the mileage of the Southern Railway doubled, the number of passengers served annually increased to nearly 12 million, and annual earnings increased from $17 million to $54 million. After his death, the Southern grew to become one of the strongest and most profitable in the United States, merging with the also strong and profitable Norfolk and Western Railway in the 1980s to form Norfolk Southern, a Fortune 500 company.

Death in railroad collision
Samuel Spencer's career was cut short when he was killed at the age of 59 in a train collision in Virginia before dawn on Thanksgiving morning, November 29, 1906. The Spencer party were in his private car, at the rear of the train, en route to his hunting lodge near Friendship, NC. When the coupling failed on the lead car, the train was left stalled on the track. A following train ran into the stranded cars in the pre-dawn darkness, crushing the Spencer car, killing Spencer & all but one of its occupants.

Spencer was buried at Oak Hill Cemetery.

Legacy

Spencer is credited with leading the Southern Railway and the South during a period of unprecedented growth. After his untimely death, 30,000 Southern Railway employees contributed to pay for a statue of him by sculptor Daniel Chester French, which was dedicated in 1910 and stood for many years at Atlanta's Terminal Station. Following the station's demolition in 1970, the statue was moved multiple times, first to Peachtree station, then in 1996 to Hardy Ivy Park, and finally to its current resting place in front of the Norfolk Southern building at the intersection of Peachtree Street and 15th Street in Midtown Atlanta.

Spencer was also a member of the Jekyll Island Club, which operated as an exclusive millionaire's retreat from 1888 to 1942. Spencer's former apartment in the Clubhouse Annex is said to be haunted by his ghost.

The Southern Railway's Spencer Shops and the town of Spencer, North Carolina were named in his honor. In 1977, the closed Spencer Shops formed the basis of the new North Carolina Transportation Museum.

See also
List of railroad executives
Spencer Yard

References

Further reading

External links
Southern Railway Historical Society
Southern Railway Historical Association covers Southern Railway history
Virginia Museum of Transportation located in Roanoke, VA
Southern Railway Yahoo Group a Yahoo group for former employees, railfans and modelers of the Southern Railway
Norfolk Southern Yahoo Group a Yahoo group for current happenings of Norfolk Southern Railway

1847 births
1906 deaths
19th-century American railroad executives
20th-century American railroad executives
Railway accident deaths in the United States
University of Georgia people
Confederate States Army soldiers
People from Columbus, Georgia
Southern Railway (U.S.)
University of Virginia alumni
Baltimore and Ohio Railroad people
Burials at Oak Hill Cemetery (Washington, D.C.)